André Fortin (born 1956) is a French Canadian mathematician, known for his research in applied and industrial mathematics. He holds a NSERC Research Chair in High Performance Scientific Computing at Université Laval.

Fortin earned his Ph.D. from the Université Laval in 1984.
His thesis advisor was Michel Fortin, a now emeritus professor of the Université Laval, recipient of Prix Summa in 1987 and prize CAIMS-SCMAI in 2005 and a member of the Royal Society of Canada in 1999.

Career
He is the director of the Groupe Interdisciplinaire de Recherche en Éléments Finis (GIREF).

In addition to over 150 research papers on mathematics, he has written a student textbook on numerical analysis for engineers "Analyse numérique pour ingénieurs" in 1994.  The textbook has been awarded the Prix Roberval in 1996.

Moreover, Fortin has received the CAIMS-Fields Industrial Mathematics Prize in 2012 in recognition of his exceptional contribution throughout his career to research in industrial mathematics.

References

20th-century Canadian mathematicians
Academic staff of Université Laval
1956 births
21st-century Canadian mathematicians
Université Laval alumni
Living people